Hualahuises is a small town in the state of Nuevo León, in northern Mexico. It serves as the administrative seat for the surrounding municipality, with which it shares a name.

The town has many folkloric things that have been preserved over the years. Hualahuises is divided into two parts: Santa Rosa and Hualahuises itself. People living there have a reputation for being very friendly and courteous.

Locator maps

Populated places in Nuevo León